Dato Marsagishvili (born March 30, 1991) is a male wrestler from Georgia, born in Stepantsminda.

At the 2012 Summer Olympics, despite losing the quarterfinals against Jaime Espinal of Puerto Rico, he was offered another shot in the repechage rounds, winning against Nigeria's Andrew Dick via walkout and defeating Soslan Gattsiev of Belarus, thus winning the bronze medal at the 2012 Summer Olympics in the men's 84 kg category.

Dato Marsagishvili retired from Olympic wrestling in 2021 and stopped competing for a spot in the Tokyo Olympics.

References

External links
 

Living people
1991 births
Male sport wrestlers from Georgia (country)
Olympic wrestlers of Georgia (country)
Olympic bronze medalists for Georgia (country)
Wrestlers at the 2012 Summer Olympics
Olympic medalists in wrestling
Medalists at the 2012 Summer Olympics
World Wrestling Championships medalists
European Wrestling Championships medalists

People from Mtskheta-Mtianeti